Arnaldo Ramos Lauzerique is a Cuban independent economist. Ramos Lauzerique and Marta Beatriz Roque founded the Instituto de Economía.

Information
The group of economists has exposed how the communist government uses false statistics when reporting to the people and to international organizations.

He was imprisoned during the Black Spring in 2003 and Amnesty International recognized him as a prisoner of conscience.

In August 2005 political prisoners Adolfo Fernández Sainz and Alfredo Domínguez Batista went on a hunger strike after Ramos was beaten by guards.

Ramos was freed in November 2010.

References

Amnesty International prisoners of conscience held by Cuba
Cuban economists
Cuban dissidents
Living people
Year of birth missing (living people)
Cuban prisoners and detainees